Christina Goulter  is a New Zealand-born British military historian who is a senior lecturer in the Defence Studies Department of King's College London.  Between 1994 and 1997 Goulter served as an Associate Visiting Professor of Strategy at the US Naval War College in Rhode Island.

Goulter researches and teaches on air power, intelligence and counter-insurgency studies.  Her publications include one book, A Forgotten Offensive: Royal Air Force Coastal Command's Anti-Shipping Campaign 1940-1945 (London: Frank Cass, 1995).

See also
 CAS Air Power Workshop

References

External links
King's College London - Christina Goulter

British military writers
Air force historians
Year of birth missing (living people)
Living people
Academics of King's College London
British military historians
Women military writers
British women historians